The Antigo Depot is a historic railroad station in Antigo, Wisconsin. The depot was designed in 1907 by Charles Sumner Frost of the architectural firm Frost & Granger in the Classical Revival style for the Chicago and North Western Railway. The two-story building also housed offices for a Chicago and North Western division headquarters. After rail service to the station ended, it was converted to apartments in 1992. The depot was added to the National Register of Historic Places on February 10, 1992.

References

Railway stations on the National Register of Historic Places in Wisconsin
Neoclassical architecture in Wisconsin
Railway stations in the United States opened in 1907
Former Chicago and North Western Railway stations
National Register of Historic Places in Langlade County, Wisconsin
Former railway stations in Wisconsin